Polson (Montana Salish: nčmqnétkʷ, Kutenai: kwataqnuk) is a city in Lake County, Montana, United States, on the southern shore of Flathead Lake. It is also on the Flathead Indian Reservation. The population was 5,148 at the 2020 census. It is the county seat of Lake County. In 1898 the city was named after pioneer rancher David Polson. It was incorporated in 1910.

Geography
Polson is located at  (47.688089, -114.156766). U.S. Route 93 passes through town. Pablo National Wildlife Refuge is just to the south.

Demographics

2010 census
As of the census of 2010, there were 4,488 people, 1,991 households, and 1,150 families living in the city. The racial makeup of the city was 74.7% White, 0.2% African American, 15.7% Native American, 0.8% Asian, 0.6% from other races, and 8.0% from two or more races. Hispanic or Latino of any race were 3.4% of the population.

There were 1,991 households, of which 29.1% had children under the age of 18 living with them, 38.6% were married couples living together, 13.9% had a female householder with no husband present, 5.3% had a male householder with no wife present, and 42.2% were non-families. 35.7% of all households were made up of individuals, and 15.9% had someone living alone who was 65 years of age or older. The average household size was 2.21 and the average family size was 2.86.

The median age in the city was 40 years. 24.2% of residents were under the age of 18; 9.1% were between the ages of 18 and 24; 22.4% were from 25 to 44; 24.5% were from 45 to 64; and 19.7% were 65 years of age or older. The gender makeup of the city was 46.9% male and 53.1% female.

2000 census
As of the census of 2000, there were 4,041 people, 1,739 households, and 1,052 families living in the city. The population density was 1,490.9 people per square mile (575.7/km). There were 1,977 housing units at an average density of 729.4 per square mile (281.7/km). The racial makeup of the city was 78.25% White, 0.15% African American, 16.11% Native American, 0.47% Asian, 0.07% Pacific Islander, 0.45% from other races, and 4.50% from two or more races. Hispanic or Latino of any race were 2.25% of the population.

There were 1,739 households, out of which 31.1% had children under the age of 18 living with them, 42.7% were married couples living together, 13.2% had a female householder with no husband present, and 39.5% were non-families. 34.0% of all households were made up of individuals, and 16.7% had someone living alone who was 65 years of age or older. The average household size was 2.25 and the average family size was 2.86.

In the city, the population was spread out, with 25.6% under the age of 18, 8.7% from 18 to 24, 25.3% from 25 to 44, 20.9% from 45 to 64, and 19.6% who were 65 years of age or older. The median age was 39 years. For every 100 females there were 86.8 males. For every 100 females age 18 and over, there were 83.8 males.

The median income for a household in the city was $21,870, and the median income for a family was $30,833. Males had a median income of $21,113 versus $19,210 for females. The per capita income for the city was $13,777. About 16.0% of families and 19.8% of the population were below the poverty line, including 27.5% of those under age 18 and 12.2% of those age 65 or over.

Government
Polson uses a city commission consisting of six commissioners and the city mayor. As of February 2020, the current mayor of Polson is Paul Briney.

Climate
Polson has a continental climate (Köppen Dfb).  However, its proximity to Flathead Lake, the largest natural freshwater body of water in the western United States, moderates its weather, meaning its winters are less cold and its summers generally less hot than adjacent areas of the same continental type.

Infrastructure
A hydro-electric concrete gravity-arch dam, Kerr Dam, was built in 1938 in Polson at river mile 72 of the Flathead River.
Since 2015, the dam is officially known as the Seli’š Ksanka Qlispe’ Dam and is operated by the Confederated Salish and Kootenai Tribes.

Polson Airport is a public use airport located one mile west of town.

Education
Polson School District educates students from kindergarten through 12th grade. Polson High School's team name is the Pirates.

North Lake County Public Library is located in Polson.

Media

Newspapers
 Flathead Beacon
 Lake County Leader
 Valley Journal

AM radio
 KERR
 KGEZ
 KJJR
 KOFI
 KQJZ-AM

FM radio
 KALS
 KANB-LP
 KBBZ
 KDBR
 KHNK
 KIBG The Big 100
 KKMT Star 99
 KQJZ-FM''
 KQRK Power 92
 KRVO
 KUKL-FM
 KWOL-FM
 KXZI-LP
 KZMN

Television
Digital stations:
 KCFW (NBC), Channel 9
 KEXI-LD (Montana PBS, Channel 35
 K26DD-D (TBN), Channel 26
 KAJJ-CD (CBS), Channel 39
 KEXI-LD (Montana PBS, Channel 35
 KTMF-LD (ABC), Channel 36

KPAX Missoula, Montana
 K11HO Channel 11 Polson
KTMF Missoula, Montana
 K14LT-D Channel 14 Polson
KECI Missoula, Montana
 K16GJ Channel 16 Polson

Gallery

References

External links

 
 
 Photos of Polson

Cities in Lake County, Montana
County seats in Montana
Cities in Montana